Fake Off is an American reality competition television series. The show features groups of performers who recreate and reimagine moments from pop culture (e.g. movies, events, television series) in spectacular 90-second routines. The teams use a diverse range of stage disciples including black light theatre, projection mapping, puppetry, and dance. The term "Faking" is used to describe the act of recreating an iconic moment. It debuted on TruTV on October 27, 2014, and is produced by Shine America. TruTV renewed the show for a second season, which was also its last.

Summary
The knock-out performance competition is hosted by Robert Hoffman and judged by actor and dancer Harry Shum, Jr., Pop Star Rozonda Thomas and renowned choreographer Michael Curry. The series features ten teams of performers who each week are given a new pop-culture theme (such as action movies, reality television, the moon landing, or the Olympic Games). Each team has one week to turn their theme into a 90-second Fake that is then scored by the three judges and the studio audience. The team whose Fake got the lowest score is eliminated from the competition. The Fakes consist of visually stunning special effects that are generated by the group through various stagecraft techniques. After eight episodes one team wins the title of America's Best Fakers and $100,000.

Contestants

Competition summary

Season 1

Week 1 
Running order

Week 2 
Running order

Week 3

Season 2 
The judges are Harry Shum Jr., Laurieann Gibson, and Beau Casper Smart.
The host is Corbin Bleu. Meghan Camarena is the backstage correspondent.

10 new teams competed in Season 2 (Academy of Villains, Astra Dance Theatre, ClownSnotBombs, CubeMetricks, The Deca Crew, JUNK, LUMA, On The Fly, The Surrealists, Tribe of Fools).

 Winners: Academy of Villains
 Runners-Up: Cubametricks
 3rd Place: The Surrealists
 4th Place: Tribe of Fools
 Eliminated: Astra Dance Theatre, LUMA, ClownSnotBombs, The Deca Crew, JUNK, On The Fly

Week 1 
The theme of the week was "Movie Night".

Reception 
The show received a positive reception from critics when it launched in October 2014.  Allison Keene from The Hollywood Reporter wrote “TruTV has truly created a flashy and worthwhile series that is  cut above current competition series, and far more exciting than yet another iteration of a singing show.” Pilot Viruet from Flavorwire wrote “I think Fake Off is my new favorite unscripted program, it was completely mesmerizing.”

References

External links
 
 

2014 American television series debuts
2015 American television series endings
2010s American reality television series
English-language television shows
TruTV original programming